Susan Jane Pinel is a Jersey politician. She was a deputy in the States Assembly for St Clement between 2011 and 2022, the Minister for Social Security between 2014 and 2018, and the Minister for Treasury and Resources between 2018 and 2022.

Early life 
Prior to entering politics, she worked in art restoration for the British royal family for eleven years, repairing miniature portraits which were damaged in the 1992 Windsor Castle fire. She received a Royal Warrant in 2001 for this work.

Political career

In the 2011 general election on 19 October 2011, Pinel received 1,314 votes and was elected with 50% of the vote, becoming one of two deputies elected to represent St Clement alongside Gerard Baudains. She was sworn into office on 14 November 2011. In November 2011, Pinel was one of Sir Philip Bailhache's nominators in the 2011 election of the Chief Minister of Jersey. She served as the Assistant Minister for Social Security from 2011 to 2014.

Pinel was re-elected in the 2014 general election on 15 October 2014, receiving 1,541 votes. On 7 November 2014, she was elected as the Social Security Minister after winning a challenge against Judy Martin and Geoff Southern with 33 votes. She had been nominated by the Chief Minister, Senator Ian Gorst.

She was re-elected in the 2018 general election on 16 May 2018, receiving 1,499 votes. On 6 June 2018, she was named by the Chief Minister, Senator John Le Fondré, as his ministerial nominee for Minister for Treasury and Resources. She was elected unopposed the following day. In 2020, she backed a proposal to amend the tax code to remove a provision from 1928 which considered a wife's income to belong to her husband and did not allow a woman to speak to Revenue Jersey about tax matters without her husband's permission. 

In July 2021, she joined the Jersey Alliance, a new centre-right political party which was founded by Chief Minister Le Fondré and Deputy Gregory Guida. She chose not to stand for re-election in the 2022 general election held on 22 June 2022. She was replaced as Minister for Treasury and Resources by Ian Gorst.

Personal life 
Pinel is a chairman of Brig-Y-Don Children’s Charity and a governor of Le Rocquier School. Her cousin is fellow Jersey politician Mark Boleat.

References

External links 

 Profile at States Assembly of Jersey
Record in the State Assembly at TheyWorkForYou

|-

|-

Living people
Deputies of Jersey
Jersey women in politics
21st-century British women politicians
Year of birth missing (living people)
Government ministers of Jersey